Coorparoo was a Legislative Assembly electorate in the state of Queensland, Australia.

History
Coorparoo was created by the Electoral Districts Act of 1949, taking effect at the 1950 elections. It was based on the former electorates of Logan and Maree.

Coorparoo was abolished at the 1960 elections, most of its area being incorporated into the new Electoral district of Chatsworth.

Members

The following people were elected in the seat of Coorparoo:

Election results

See also
 Electoral districts of Queensland
 Members of the Queensland Legislative Assembly by year
 :Category:Members of the Queensland Legislative Assembly by name

References

Former electoral districts of Queensland
1950 establishments in Australia
1960 disestablishments in Australia
Constituencies established in 1950
Constituencies disestablished in 1960